Machy may refer to:
 -machy, suffix meaning a fight or battle
 Machy, Aube, a commune in the department of Aube, France
 Machy, Somme, a commune in the department of Somme, France
 Le Sieur de Machy, a French composer